"He Would Be Sixteen" is a song written by Jill Colucci, Charlie Black and Austin Roberts, and recorded by Canadian country music artist Michelle Wright.  It was released in October 1992 as the third single from her third studio album, Now and Then.  It peaked at number 3 on the RPM Country Tracks chart in January 1993.

Content
The song is a ballad about a woman who has put her son up for adoption, and wonders what the son is doing now.

Wright said in A Year in the Life that she did not identify with the song when she recorded it, because she had never been pregnant or put a child up for adoption, but she chose to record it anyway because it received positive feedback in concerts.

Critical reception
The song was nominated for a Juno Award for Single of the Year at the 1994 Juno Awards.

Chart performance

Year-end charts

References

1992 singles
Michelle Wright songs
Arista Nashville singles
Songs written by Charlie Black
Songs written by Jill Colucci
Songs written by Austin Roberts (singer)
Music videos directed by Steven Goldmann
1992 songs
Canadian Country Music Association Single of the Year singles
Canadian Country Music Association Video of the Year videos
Songs about parenthood
Works about adoption